This article is about libraries in Dallas, Texas (USA).

Dallas Public Library

The city of Dallas is served by the Dallas Public Library system.  The system was originally created by the Dallas Federation of Women's Clubs with efforts spearheaded by then-president Mrs. Henry (May Dickson) Exall. Her work in raising money led to a grant from philanthropist and steel baron Andrew Carnegie, which enabled the construction of the first branch in 1901. Today the library operates 25 branch locations throughout the city  including the J. Erik Jonsson Central Library, the eight-story main branch in the Government District of downtown.

Branches

Arcadia Park Branch Library in West Dallas
Audelia Road Branch Library in Lake Highlands
Bachman Lake Library in North Dallas
Casa View Branch Library in the Casa Linda neighborhood of east Dallas
Dallas West Branch Library in West Dallas
Forest Green Branch Library in Lake Highlands
Fretz Park Branch Library in North Dallas
Grauwyler Park Branch Library in Dallas
Hampton-Illinois Branch Library in Oak Cliff
Highland Hills Branch Library in the Highland Hills neighborhood of South Dallas
Kleberg-Rylie Branch Library in far Southeast Dallas
Lakewood Branch Library in Lakewood
Martin Luther King Jr. Library and Learning Center near Fair Park
Mountain Creek Branch Library in Mountain Creek
North Oak Cliff Branch Library in Oak Cliff
Oak Lawn Branch Library in Oak Lawn
Park Forest Branch Library in North Dallas
Paul Laurence Dunbar Lancaster-Kiest Branch Library in South Dallas
Pleasant Grove Branch Library in Pleasant Grove
Polk-Wisdom Branch Library in Southwest Dallas
Preston Royal Branch Library in North Dallas
Renner Frankford Branch Library in Far North Dallas
Skillman Southwestern Branch Library in East Dallas
Skyline Branch Library in East Dallas
Timberglen Branch Library in Far North Dallas

UT Southwestern Medical Library

The University of Texas Southwestern Medical Center in the Stemmons Corridor operates a library across two branches on its north and south campuses. The library holds 259,000 volumes in all formats, including 86,000 books and 54,000 full-text electronic journals.

References

External links
 Dallas Public Library